The Inverness Lions are a Scottish basketball club, based in the city of Inverness, Scotland.

Club
Inverness City B.C. was established as a youth focused club, with training and games for kids aged 6 to 18. In its short history the club has developed several players who have gone on to represent Scotland at age-grade international level.

As the club grew, a senior team was added, providing a full pathway to progress through the Club. The Lions name was then adopted, and in 2015, the club became part of the Inverness Community Sport Hub.

In 2019, the Lions' men's team entered the Scottish Men's National League for the first time. They are the first senior men's team from the Highlands to play at this level.

Teams
For the 2019-20 season, the Lions will field the following teams:

Senior Men - National League Division 2
Senior Men II - Highland League

U18 Men - National League U18 Division 1
U18 Women - National League U18 Division 1

U16 Boys - National League U16 Division 1
U16 Girls - National League U16 Division 1

Home Venue
The Lions are based at various venues in the city, including  Inverness Royal Academy and Millburn Academy.

Men's season-by-season records

References

Basketball teams in Scotland
Sport in Inverness
2014 establishments in Scotland
Basketball teams established in 2014